Ambatolampy is a district in Vakinankaratra Region, in Madagascar. The district has a total population estimated at 299,512 in 2018. The seat of the district administration is the town of Ambatolampy.
It is situated at 70 km South from the capital Antananarivo.

Communes
The district is further divided into 19 communes:

 Ambatolampy
 Ambatondrakalavao
 Ambodifarihy Fenomanana
 Ambohipihaonana
 Andranovelona
 Andravola Vohipeno
 Andriambilany
 Antakasina
 Antanamalaza
 Antanimasaka
 Antsampandrano
 Behenjy
 Belambo
 Manjakatompo
 Morarano
 Sabotsy Namatoana
 Tsiafajavona Ankaratra
 Tsinjoarivo

Economy
Ambatolampy is known for its Aluminium founderies. Most of aluminium kitchen utensils in Madagascar are produced in this region.
The founderies also work with copper and bronze.

Museums
In Ambatolampy, route de Tsinjoarivo, is situated the Butterfly museum (Musée des Papillons) that exhibits 6000 species of insects and butterflies.

References

Districts of Vakinankaratra